Wat Sri Chomphu Ong Tue, Wat Ongtue  or Wat Nam Mong is a Buddhist temple in Thailand. The temple houses Luang Pho Phraehao Ongtue one of the largest Buddha representations in all of Laos which stands four meters tall and is believed to have been cast in 1562.

References 

Buddhist temples in Thailand
Buildings and structures in Nong Khai province